Francis Pancratius "Kiko" Nepomuceno Pangilinan is a Filipino lawyer, politician, and farm owner who served as a Senator from 2001 to 2013 and from 2016 to 2022. He was the Senate Majority Leader from 2004 to 2008.

A graduate of the University of the Philippines College of Law and Harvard Kennedy School, Pangilinan was first elected to the Quezon City Council, serving from 1988 to 1992. In between his stints in the Senate, he was the Presidential Assistant for Food Security and Agricultural Modernization to President Benigno Aquino III from 2014 to 2015.

Pangilinan ran for vice president of the Philippines in the 2022 election under the Liberal Party as the running mate of Vice President Leni Robredo. However, he lost his vice-presidential bid to Sara Duterte, running mate of eventual president Bongbong Marcos.

Early life and education
Francis Pancratius Nepomuceno Pangilinan was born to Donato Tongol Pangilinan, Jr., an engineer and entrepreneur from Pampanga, and Emma Monasterial Nepomuceno, a public school teacher from Nueva Ecija and Marinduque. He has eight siblings.

Pangilinan completed his primary and secondary education at La Salle Green Hills in 1977 and 1981, respectively. Between school years, his father continuously assigned him and his siblings roles in their family businesses; for their Manila Pearl furniture factory, Francis was made a timekeeper as a child and a project coordinator at 19. He graduated with a Bachelor of Arts in English, Major in Comparative Literature degree at the University of the Philippines (UP) Diliman, and was a varsity athlete for the UP Men's Volleyball Team.

As an undergraduate, Pangilinan was elected as chairperson of the UP Diliman University Student Council in 1986, and served as a student regent of the UP Board of Regents in 1987. He was a member of Upsilon Sigma Phi while in attendance at the university, where he would subsequently obtain his Bachelor of Laws degree from the UP College of Law. Alongside his studies at the university, Pangilinan set up a fishball stand along Commonwealth Avenue, Quezon City, later naming it "Eat-a-bols" upon expanding the business to three locations and 40 steel carts, with him earning a partnership with Nestlé to serve Nestea alongside fishballs.

In 1997, Pangilinan moved to Boston, Massachusetts to pursue a Master of Public Administration degree at Harvard Kennedy School, where he graduated with a general average of A-.

Political career

Quezon City
In 1988, Pangilinan was elected as the youngest councilor of Quezon City from the 4th district. During his stint as councilor, he became the founding president of the National Movement of Young Legislators. In 1992, he unsuccessfully ran in the congressional elections in Quezon City.

Senate
Pangilinan was elected to the senate in 2001 and was re-elected six years thereafter. In 2002, he and then-National Youth Commission (NYC) chairman Bam Aquino established the Ten Accomplished Youth Organizations (TAYO) Awards, which recognizes the contributions of youth organizations in public service and nation-building.

He was first elected as senate majority leader in 2004. On July 23, 2007, Jinggoy Estrada was voted Senate president pro tempore, while Pangilinan became the majority leader following the assumption of Manuel Villar to the chamber's leadership of the 14th Congress.

In 2008, Pangilinan created the Judicial Executive Legislative Advisory and Consultative Council, first proposed on the July 16–17, 2007 Manila Hotel summit on extrajudicial killings and forced disappearances in the Philippines.

He chaired the Senate Committee on Agriculture in 2010, during which he authored the Organic Agriculture Act of 2010, which aimed to further promote the development of organic agricultural practices and protect indigenous organic farmers in the country.

Aquino cabinet
In May 2014, Pangilinan was appointed as the presidential assistant for food security and agricultural modernization, a cabinet-level position under the Office of the President of the Philippines, by President Benigno Aquino III. As OPAFSAM head, he pushed for the creation of the coco levy trust fund for coconut farmers, in an attempt to rectify the ills created by the Coco Levy Fund scam involving former president Ferdinand Marcos and his cronies who collected taxes from farmers purportedly to develop the industry. In September 2015, Pangilinan announced his resignation from the post to run for senator in 2016.

Return to the Senate
Pangilinan won a third term in the 2016 Philippine Senate election, placing 8th overall.

In October 2016, he was appointed interim Liberal Party president, succeeding former Transportation and Communications Secretary Joseph Emilio Abaya. His appointment became permanent in August 2017. In May 2019, Pangilinan announced his resignation as Liberal Party president following the failure of Otso Diretso, where he served as its campaign manager, to win a single seat in the 2019 senatorial election. However, his resignation was rejected by Liberal Party chairperson Leni Robredo.

Originally a part of the majority, Pangilinan became part of the minority bloc in the Senate after the 2019 election, together with Senators Franklin Drilon, Risa Hontiveros, Leila de Lima, Bam Aquino and Antonio Trillanes. He principally authored the Sagip Saka Act signed on April 17, 2019. The bill aims to boost incomes for both fisherfolk and farmers through entrepreneurship by mandating government agencies to buy produce directly from them, eliminating middlemen that raise food prices. Pangilinan was also the principal author of Republic Act 11478, which would increase the bed capacity of the Bicol Medical Center from 500 beds to 1,000 beds. This also included upgrading its service facilities and professional health care services and authorizing the increase of its medical workforce complement. As a member of the minority, Pangilinan has been critical of the administration of President Rodrigo Duterte, including the War on Drugs with its "iron-fist" approach.

In 2020, Pangilinan authored the Coconut Farmers and Industry Trust Fund Act, which seeks to create a trust fund for coconut farmers to be used for several purposes such as management, utilization, and reconstitution for the purposes of the Philippine Coconut Authority Board. He had also co-authored laws pertaining to education, such as the GMRC and Values Education Act, institutionalizing values education in the K-12 curriculum, and the Alternative Learning System Act, which institutionalizes the alternative learning system in basic education for out-of-school children.

Pangilinan co-authored the COVID Vaccination Program Act of 2021, which aims to expedite the procurement and distribution of COVID-19 vaccines across the country.

2022 vice presidential campaign

On October 8, 2021, Pangilinan filed his certificate of candidacy to run as vice president, alongside presidential candidate Leni Robredo, in the 2022 Philippine presidential election. Unlike Robredo who is running as an independent candidate, Pangilinan ran as the candidate of the Liberal Party. He initially chose to seek reelection as senator.

One of his opponents in the vice-presidential election was his uncle-by-marriage and colleague, Senate President Tito Sotto (the husband of his aunt-in-law Helen Gamboa), who is running alongside Senator Panfilo Lacson. Pangilinan has stated that the conflictive situation was "painful" for his family.

Pangilinan's campaign slogan was "Goodbye Gutom, Hello Pagkain", as his platform focused on the agricultural sector, particularly boosting food security by providing fishermen and farmers priority attention.

Pangilinan placed second in the official tally with 9,329,207 votes, and lost to Davao City Mayor Sara Duterte by a wide margin of over 22 million votes.

Personal life
On April 28, 1996, Pangilinan married singer, actress, and television personality Sharon Cuneta. The couple has two daughters, including singer-songwriter Kakie, and an adopted son. He is also the stepfather of actress and singer KC Concepcion, Cuneta's daughter from a previous marriage, whom Pangilinan legally adopted.

Pangilinan and Cuneta own Sweet Spring Country Farm, an all-organic farm in Alfonso, Cavite.

References

External links
 Senator Kiko Pangilinan – Senate of the Philippines
 
 Kiko Pangilinan's Facebook Page
 Verified 

|-

|-

|-

|-

Living people
People from Manila
Francis
Academic staff of Ateneo de Manila University
Kapampangan people
Harvard Kennedy School alumni
People from Quezon City
Filipino farmers
Filipino YouTubers
Assistants to the President of the Philippines
Senators of the 18th Congress of the Philippines
Senators of the 17th Congress of the Philippines
Senators of the 15th Congress of the Philippines
Senators of the 14th Congress of the Philippines
Senators of the 13th Congress of the Philippines
Senators of the 12th Congress of the Philippines
Majority leaders of the Senate of the Philippines
University of the Philippines Diliman alumni
De La Salle University alumni
Laban ng Demokratikong Pilipino politicians
Liberal Party (Philippines) politicians
Presidents of the Liberal Party of the Philippines
Quezon City Council members
Benigno Aquino III administration personnel
Candidates in the 2022 Philippine vice-presidential election
People from Cavite
Year of birth missing (living people)